Tuleap is an application lifecycle management system which facilitates agile software development, design projects, V-model, Requirement Management, and IT Services Management. It is open source and released under the GNU General Public License, version 2.

Tuleap is an enterprise alternative to proprietary tools like CollabNet, Jira (and the Atlassian Suite) and Confluence, and Crucible. 

The software is developed and maintained by Enalean, a French tech company founded in 2011 and headquartered in France.

Overview
Tuleap is a software platform for project management using development methodologies including Agile, traditional or hybrid or custom processes. It helps organizations meet industry standards like Capability Maturity Model Integration (CMMI) and ITIL. Tuleap facilitates the planning of software releases, the prioritization of business requirements, the assignment of tasks to project members, the monitoring of project progress, and the creation of reports. It features site-wide trackers and real-time reports on risks, requirements, tasks, bugs, change requests, support requests, user stories. It supports Kanban, Scrum, and hybrid methodologies in project management. Tuleap has a built-in risk management system.

Tuleap is used by Fortune 500 companies, small and medium enterprises, and open source projects. Its users include developers at major companies like STMicroelectronics, Ericsson, Orange.

Notable users:
 Airbus
 CEA, the French Alternative Energies and Atomic Energy Commission
 DSI de l’Université de Grenoble
 Eclipse Foundation
 French Government VITAM programme
 OpenForge, Ministry of Electronics and IT, Government of India
 Orange
 Portuguese Public Institute
 STMicroelectronics

Features
Tuleap integrates forge system functionalities to manage software sources, using Subversion, Git or CVS. Teams are able to share technical or project documentations, track bugs, and consolidate communications with customers, developers or third parties.

Tuleap's kanban tool enables teams to create task boards on the fly. Agile scrum workspaces can also be created.

Awards 
In 2018, Opensource.com named Tuleap one of the top 7 open source tools for Agile Teams. It also named it one of the top 5 open source project management tools in 2015. 

InfoWorld magazine awarded it the "Best Open Source Application Development Tools" (the Bossie Awards) in 2013.

References

External links
 

Free project management software
Project management software
Free business software
Free application software